Ansam Sawalha (born 1969), who is the Dean of the Faculty of Pharmacy at An-Najah National University, is the first Palestinian woman named to the Women in Science Hall of Fame.  Sawalha was honored for her achievement of establishing the first Poison Control and Drug Information Center in Palestine in 2006.

Early life and education
Sawalha earned her pharmacy degree at University of Texas at Austin.

Career
Sawalha started at An-Najah University in 1999 as faculty of university pharmacy program.

References

Living people
Palestinian pharmacologists
1969 births
Academic staff of An-Najah National University
University of Texas at Austin alumni
People from Asira ash-Shamaliya